Survivor: Blood vs. Water is the 27th season of the American CBS competitive reality television series Survivor. The season filmed in May–June 2013 and premiered on Wednesday, September 18, 2013, featuring returning castaways and their loved ones competing against each other. It was the third consecutive season, and the ninth season overall, to feature returning contestants. As with the previous two seasons, the season was filmed in the Philippines and this was the third season filmed in the country, but this time at Palaui Island, Cagayan. Tyson Apostol was named the Sole Survivor in the season finale on December 15, 2013, defeating runners-up Monica Culpepper and Gervase Peterson in a 7–1–0 vote.

Redemption Island, a twist formerly seen in Survivor: Redemption Island and Survivor: South Pacific, was utilized after a three-season hiatus. In conjunction with the "Blood vs. Water" twist, remaining contestants were given the option to switch places with their loved one if their loved one was on Redemption Island. The game began with a twist called Day Zero, in which each of the ten pairs was marooned in a separate location, spending the night together before congregating as a full cast the following morning and dividing into two tribes. Due to this twist, this season is one of three to last longer than 39 days, after Survivor: The Australian Outback which lasted 42 days, and being followed by Survivor: San Juan del Sur, the second "Blood vs. Water" season, which also began with Day Zero. This season also marks the second occurrence of the rock-picking tiebreaker, 23 seasons after it first occurred in Survivor: Marquesas in 2002. This is also the first time in 13 seasons, since Survivor: Fiji, to not feature a fan favorite vote that would award one player with US$100,000.

Casting
Roberta "R.C." Saint-Amour from Philippines and her father, Craig, were originally cast and traveled to Palaui Island with the other castaways, but were pulled from the game the day before filming began due to Craig having high blood pressure. They were replaced by Candice Woodcock Cody from Cook Islands and Heroes vs. Villains, and her husband John. "Troyzan" Robertson from One World was initially cast with his brother Todd, however they were cut a week before filming. Robertson would later return for Survivor: Game Changers. Jim Rice from South Pacific was asked to compete with his wife, but neither of them were able to participate.

According to interviews onRob has a Podcast, as part of their Talking with T-Bird program, Kelly Goldsmith (Africa) and her fiancé were contacted to be part of the season. Judd Sergeant of Guatemala and his wife were also contacted to be part of this season, but his wife was not able to. Sean Rector of Marquesas was contacted as well. Marty Piombo of Nicaragua was contacted to play with either his wife or son, but was cut. Earl Cole from Fiji was also considered. Lex van den Berghe of Africa was approached to play with his son, however, he declined as he did not want to play against a family member. It was also revealed on Talking with T-Bird that Jerri Manthey of The Australian Outback, All-Stars, and Heroes vs. Villains and her sister were contacted to be part of the season. Roger Bingham (The Australian Outback) and his daughter were considered as contestants for this season. Cristina Coria of Cook Islands was asked to return to compete alongside an actor she was dating at the time, but she couldn't participate after just having surgery on her neck and back. Ozzy Lusth of Cook Islands, Micronesia, and South Pacific was also contacted to return, and had submitted his sister to be his loved one pair. Lusth was ultimately not cast, but later returned on Game Changers.

Contestants

The cast consists of 10 pairs of loved ones, each composed of one new player and one returning player with varying relationships, including mother-daughter, spouses, fiancees, dating, brothers, and uncle-niece. The tribe names were Galang and Tadhana, which means "respect" and "destiny", respectively, in Tagalog. The merged tribe Kasama which means "to accompany" in Tagalog. Notable cast includes former NFL player Brad Culpepper, competing alongside his wife, Survivor: One World castaway Monica, and Big Brother 12 winner Hayden Moss, playing alongside his girlfriend Kat Edorsson, also from One World. Moss is the first former Big Brother contestant to appear on Survivor.

Future appearances
Ciera Eastin, Vytas Baskauskas, and Brad Culpepper were included on the public poll to choose the cast of Survivor: Cambodia. Eastin and Baskauskas were chosen to compete; while Culpepper was not. Culpepper eventually returned, along with Eastin, for Survivor: Game Changers. Monica Culpepper also appeared on Survivor: Game Changers as a loved one. Tyson Apostol later returned to compete on Survivor: Winners at War. Rachel Foulger also appeared on Survivor: Winners at War as part of the loved ones visit.

Outside of Survivor, Apostol and Foulger appeared on the fourth season of Marriage Boot Camp. Apostol proposed to Foulger on the season finale, and she accepted. Rupert and Laura Boneham competed as a team in The Amazing Race 31. In 2022, Apostol competed on The Challenge: USA.

Season summary
The players were divided into two tribes of ten: Galang, composed of returning players, and Tadhana, the returning players’ loved ones. Tadhana lost the first four consecutive challenges, and was initially dominated by a men's alliance led by Brad. Brad's decision to blindside his ally John resulted in Brad's subsequent elimination and the end of the men's alliance. When Galang first went to Tribal Council, Aras spearheaded the elimination of Laura M. in hopes that she could eliminate Brad in a Redemption Island challenge to ensure the loyalty of Brad's wife, Monica. The plan was successful, and Laura M. returned to the game at the merge.

The tribes merged with 11 players remaining, including three pairs of loved ones: Aras and Vytas, Tina and Katie, and Laura M. and Ciera. The five players without loved ones remaining in the game formed an alliance led by Tyson, and were able to recruit Laura M. and Ciera to send Aras, Vytas, and Tina to Redemption Island before betraying Laura M. for being the stronger member of the final intact pair. With no pairs remaining, the new players outnumbered the returnees four to three, but the new players’ attempt to seize control was foiled by Ciera, who sided with the returnees. However, with six players left, she changed allegiances, forcing a tie which was resolved through random draw, resulting in Katie's elimination. This allowed the returning players alliance of Tyson, Monica, and Gervase to take control, voting out the others and making it to the end of the game.

At the Final Tribal Council, Gervase was berated by the jury for his perceived rudeness and hiding behind more dominant players, while Monica was castigated for threatening to flip to the other alliance but ultimately never following through. This led the jury to award Tyson the title of Sole Survivor, receiving seven of the eight votes to win, and Monica receiving one.

In the case of the immunity and reward winner being able to share their reward with others, the invitees are in brackets.

Episodes

Voting history

Reception

The season received generally positive reception, primarily for the theme of returning players competing against their loved ones (which allowed for some less memorable returning players to introduce more memorable loved ones to the game), the gameplay of winner Tyson Apostol, and the alterations to the Redemption Island twist that made it somewhat more enjoyable than in previous seasons. Dalton Ross of Entertainment Weekly ranked it #12 in the series, saying that "the returning contestants playing with/against their loved ones twist added new dimensions and forced players – and us – to think about the strategic elements of the game in an entirely new way." Despite him not being a fan of Redemption Island, he added that "it is undeniable that the RI element is what led to many of the intriguing strategic decisions of whom to vote out and why," and concluded that the season was "a super solid season from top to bottom and a nice change of pace." Tom Santilli of Examiner.com, ranking it as the 9th-greatest season, particularly praised the "fine cast of 10 returning players," some of the new players whom he felt were "potential future all-stars" (including Brad Culpepper, Eastin, and Moss), and "the dominance of winner Tyson that made the season end on a strong note," while also claiming that "the Tribal Councils throughout the season were arguably the show's strongest ever, and featured an unpredictability we hadn’t experienced since earlier seasons." In 2014, the annual poll of fansite “Survivor Oz” saw Blood vs. Water rank as the 3rd-greatest season of the series out of the first 28, only behind Survivor: Heroes vs. Villains, and Blood vs. Water’s successor, Survivor: Cagayan. In 2015, a poll by Rob Has a Podcast ranked this season 9th out of 30 with Rob Cesternino ranking this season 10th. This was updated in 2021 during Cesternino's podcast, Survivor All-Time Top 40 Rankings, ranking 14th out of 40. In 2020, The "Purple Rock Podcast" ranked this season 16th out of 40 and praised the cast and the strategy that came from the blood vs. water concept. Later that same year, Inside Survivor ranked this season 19th out of 40 calling it "a genuinely fun and entertaining season, albeit with a predictable winner."

References

External links 
 Official CBS Survivor: Blood vs. Water Website

2013 in Philippine television
2013 American television seasons
27
Television shows set in the Philippines
Television shows filmed in the Philippines